Regiment Port Natal was a motorised infantry regiment of the South African Army. It formed part of the South African Army Infantry Formation. As a reserve unit, it had a status roughly equivalent to that of a present-day British Army Reserve or United States Army National Guard unit.

History

Origin
In 1969, Durban Regiment was instructed to transfer all Afrikaans speaking unit members to a newly formed unit, Regiment Port Natal.

Operations
Regiment Port Natal saw active service on internal security duties in the Natal Province.

Regiment Port Natal was assigned to  84 Motorised Brigade.

Amalgamation
Regiment Port Natal was eventually amalgamated with Durban Light Infantry Regiment in the 1980s.

Colours
The Regiment was awarded its Regimental Coloura wildebeest head with the motto  on a black silk backgroundin July 1974 by Mr P W Botha, the then Minister of Defence. 

On 14 July 1990, National Colours were presented to the Regiment by Major General D J Mortimer.

Insignia

Dress Insignia

References

Infantry regiments of South Africa
Port Natal
Military units and formations established in 1969